Two ships of the French Navy have borne the name Aquitaine in honour of the region of Aquitaine:

  (1915), an auxiliary ship converted from a civilian steamer during the First World War.
 Aquitaine  the lead ship of the FREMM multipurpose frigate class; commissioned on 23 November 2012.

References

French Navy ship names